Raising the Roofs is a 2006 reality television show on Spike TV, following the life of aspiring actor Michael Roof, and the misadventures of his self described Florida cracker dad and uncle, in Hollywood, California.

Episode list
 "Home Is Where the Fart Is" – July 6, 2006
 "Show Me the Hunnies" – July 13, 2006
 "Money for Nuthin' Hicks for Free" – July 20, 2006
 "$100 Dollars on Redneck" – July 27, 2006  
 "Bright Lights, Big Boobies" – August 3, 2006 
 "Erection Day" – August 10, 2006

External links
 

2000s American reality television series
2006 American television series debuts
2006 American television series endings
Spike (TV network) original programming